Illinois Route 125 (IL-125) is a major  highway in the central portion of the U.S. state of Illinois. Illinois 125 runs east from the concurrent U.S. Route 67 and Illinois Route 100 near Beardstown to Illinois Route 97 in Farmingdale, west of Springfield.

Route description 

Illinois 125 lies within Cass County and Sangamon County, and serves the towns of Ashland and Virginia.  Virginia is the county seat of Cass County.

IL-125 follows most of the route of the Sangamon Trail, a pioneer trail from Springfield, the state capital, to the Illinois River.

Points of interest marked on IL-125, but not directly on the road, include the Jim Edgar Panther Creek State Fish and Wildlife Area in eastern Cass County northwest of Ashland, and the old Cass County courthouse in Beardstown where lawyer Abraham Lincoln practiced.

History 
SBI Route 125 originally ran from Springfield to Virginia. In 1968 it was extended west to Beardstown, replacing U.S. 67 and parts of Illinois Route 3. The next year it was truncated on its eastern portion from Springfield to Illinois 97. There have been no changes to Illinois 125 since 1969.

Major intersections

References

External links

125
U.S. Route 67
Transportation in Cass County, Illinois
Transportation in Sangamon County, Illinois